I Feel Better is a 2017 French comedy film directed by Jean-Pierre Améris.

Cast
 Éric Elmosnino : Laurent
 Ary Abittan : Edouard
 Judith El Zein : Elise
 Alice Pol : Pauline
 François Berléand : Audibert
 Lise Lamétrie : Laurent's mother
 Henri Guybet : Laurent's father
 Sacha Bourdo : Vassilis
 Sabine Pakora : The prostitute

References

External links

2017 films
2010s French-language films
2017 comedy films
Films directed by Jean-Pierre Améris
EuropaCorp films
French comedy films
2010s French films